Sponsored film, or ephemeral film, as defined by film archivist Rick Prelinger, is a film made by a particular sponsor for a specific purpose other than as a work of art: the films were designed to serve a specific pragmatic purpose for a limited time. Many of the films are also orphan works since they lack copyright owners or active custodians to guarantee their long-term preservation.

Types of sponsored film
The genre is composed of advertising films, educational films, industrial videos, training films, social guidance films, and government-produced films.

While some may borrow themes from well-known film genres such as western film, musicals, and comedies, what defines them is a sponsored rhetoric to achieve the sponsor's goals, rather than those of the creative artist.

Sponsored films in 16mm were loaned at no cost, except sometimes postage, to clubs, schools, and other groups.  America's largest companies - AT&T, DuPont, Ford, General Electric, General Motors, Republic Steel, Standard Oil, and  Westinghouse Electric Company - were for decades active sponsored film producers and distributors; others included airlines who offered travelogues on their destinations.  In the early years of commercial television, local television stations often used sponsored films as "filler" programming.  Specialized  distributing agents packaged films from various sponsors into TV programs with titles like Compass, Color Camera, Ladies' Day, and Adventures In Living.

Usage
The films are often used as B-roll in documentary films, for instance, the social guidance film The Terrible Truth (1951, Sid Davis) appears, desaturated, in Ron Mann's Grass (1999) as an example of what he perceives as hysteria over drug abuse, as well as an example of the slippery slope fallacy.

Prelinger and other film archivists  generally consider the films interesting for their sociological, ethnographic, or evidentiary value: for instance, a mental hygiene film instructing children to be careful of strangers may seem laughable by today's standards, but the film may show important aspects of society which were documented unintentionally: hairstyles, popular fashions, technological advances, landscapes, etc.

Prelinger estimates that the form includes perhaps 400,000 films and, as such, is the largest genre of films, but that one-third to one-half of the films have been lost to neglect. In the late 20th century, the archival moving-image community has taken greater notice of sponsored film, and key ephemeral films began to be preserved by specialized, regional, and national archives.

A number of British films in this style were re-evaluated and released commercially by the British Film Institute in 2010 as part of its Boom Britain / Shadows of Progress project.

Examples of sponsored films include Design for Dreaming, A Touch of Magic, and A Word to the Wives. Technicolor for Industrial Films is a sponsored film about sponsored films.

See also
 Prelinger Archives
 
 Industrial musical
 Infomercial
 Grey literature
 Mystery Science Theater 3000
 Kitsch
 Camp (style)

References

External links
 The Industry Film Archive
 Online Field Guide to Sponsored Films: National Film Preservation Foundation
 Ephemeral Films on Archive.org
 Curated Collection of Jamieson Film Company materials at the Texas Archive of the Moving Image
 Ephemeral Films: National Socialism in Austria
 PRELINGER.COM

Film genres
 Sponsored
Audiovisual ephemera
1930s in film
1940s in film
1950s in film
1960s in film